A gravitational soliton is a soliton solution of the Einstein field equation. It can be separated into two kinds, a soliton of the vacuum Einstein field equation generated by the Belinski-Zakharov transform, and a soliton of the Einstein–Maxwell equations generated by the Belinski-Zakharov-Alekseev transform.

References

General relativity